DeWayne McKinney was an ATM entrepreneur and wrongfully convicted and imprisoned American man.

Murder trial
McKinney was found guilty of the 1980 Orange County, California, killing of Burger King manager Walter Horace Bell Jr. After four employees identified him in court as the gunman, he was sent to prison in 1981.

Exoneration
McKinney was released in January 2000 when new evidence was revealed that exonerated him. Two other men admitted their guilt for the crime and two of the eyewitnesses that identified him as the gunman recanted their testimonies.

Leaving prison after more than 19 years, he received a $1,000,000 settlement from his wrongful conviction lawsuit.

Business career
He invested his money in becoming an ATM owner in the Los Angeles area. While visiting Hawaii on vacation, he noticed a need in the market for more ATMs to serve the tourism industry and used his compensation payment as start up capital for his successful business.

Death
He died October 7, 2008, at the age of 47, in a motor vehicle accident in Honolulu, Hawaii.

See also
List of wrongful convictions in the United States

References

Prisoners sentenced to life imprisonment by California
American financial businesspeople
Road incident deaths in Hawaii
Year of birth missing
2008 deaths
American people wrongfully convicted of murder